Aleksandr Sergeyevich Anufriyev (born 21 July 1995) is a Belarusian professional footballer who plays for Gomel.

Honours
Gomel
Belarusian Cup winner: 2021–22

References

External links 
 
 

1995 births
Living people
Belarusian footballers
Association football midfielders
FC BATE Borisov players
FC Smorgon players
FC Smolevichi players
FC Slavia Mozyr players
FC Minsk players
FC Isloch Minsk Raion players
FC Dynamo Brest players
FC Gomel players